Ceratopipra is a genus of passerine birds in the family Pipridae.

Taxonomy
The genus Ceratopipra was introduced by the French naturalist Charles Lucien Bonaparte in 1854 with the scarlet-horned manakin as the type species. The name Ceratopipra combines the Ancient Greek κερας keras, κερατος keratos "horn" with the genus Pipra introduced by Carl Linnaeus in 1764.

Species
The genus contains the five species:

These species were previously included in the genus Pipra, but molecular phylogenetic studies have shown that this placement renders Pipra non-monophyletic.

References

 
Taxa named by Charles Lucien Bonaparte